Ruth Simmons (born Ruth Jean Stubblefield, July 3, 1945) is an American professor and an academic administrator. She is the president of Prairie View A&M University, a historically black university.

Simmons previously served as the 18th president of Brown University from 2001 to 2012, where she was the first African American president of an Ivy League institution. Prior to Brown University, she headed Smith College, one of the Seven Sisters and the largest women's college in the United States, beginning in 1995. In 2017, she was called out of retirement and named the eighth president of Prairie View A&M University in her home state of Texas. On March 11, 2022, she announced that she would step down as president when the university named her successor. She will continue serving at Prairie View A&M University in other capacities.

Simmons is a fellow of the American Academy of Arts and Sciences, the American Philosophical Society, and an honorary fellow of Selwyn College, Cambridge.

Early life and education
Simmons was born in Grapeland, Texas, the last of 12 children of Fanny (née Campbell) and Isaac Stubblefield. Her father was a sharecropper until the family moved to Houston during her school years. Her paternal grandfather descends partly from the Benza and Kota people, enslaved people from Gabon, while her maternal line is traced back to the indigenous peoples of the Caribbean who were enslaved by the Spaniards.

She earned her bachelor's degree, on scholarship, from Dillard University in New Orleans, Louisiana, in 1967. She earned her master's and a doctorate in Romance literature from Harvard University in 1970 and 1973, respectively.

Career

Early academic positions 
Simmons was an assistant professor of French at the University of New Orleans (UNO) from 1973-1976 and Assistant Dean of the UNO's College of Liberal Arts from 1975–76. She moved to California State University, Northridge in 1977 as administrative coordinator of its NEH Liberal Studies Project. From 1978–79, she was acting director of CSU-Northridge's International Programs and visiting associate professor of Pan-African Studies.

Simmons moved to the University of Southern California in 1979 as assistant dean of graduate studies, and then as associate dean of graduate studies. She moved to Princeton University in 1983 and served as assistant dean of faculty and then associate dean of faculty from 1986 to 1990. Simmons served as provost at Spelman College from 1990 to 1991 and returned to Princeton as its vice provost from 1992 to 1995.

Smith College presidency 
In 1995, Simmons was selected as president of Smith College, which she led until 2001. As president of Smith College, Simmons started the first engineering program at a U.S. woman's college.

Brown University presidency 

In November 2000, Simmons became the first African American woman to head an Ivy League school, assuming the office in October 2001, succeeding Gordon Gee. She also held appointments as a professor in the Departments of Comparative Literature and Africana Studies. In 2002, Newsweek selected her as a Ms. Woman of the Year, while in 2001, Time named her as America's best college president.

At Brown, she completed a $1.4 billion initiative – the largest in Brown's history – known as Boldly Brown: The Campaign for Academic Enrichment to enhance Brown's academic programs. In 2004, former Brown student Sidney E. Frank made the largest aggregate monetary contribution to Brown in its history in the amount of $120 million. The Frank gifts were principally devoted to scholarship assistance to Brown students and Brown's programs in the sciences.

By early 2007, philanthropist Warren Alpert made a similarly generous contribution to strengthening the programs of The Warren Alpert Medical School of Brown University in the amount of $100 million, matching the core portion of the Sidney Frank gift to Brown. As reported in a May 22, 2009, press release, Brown Chancellor Thomas J. Tisch announced the early  attainment of the $1.4 billion fundraising campaign and the continued pursuit of specific subsidiary goals in support of endowments for student scholarships, the Brown faculty and internationalization programs through the originally planned campaign completion date of December 31, 2010.

In a 2006, during an orientation meeting with parents, Simmons denied interest in the presidency of Harvard University, headed by an interim president, Derek Bok. Nevertheless, a 2007 New York Times article, featuring a photograph of Simmons, reported that the Harvard Corporation, responsible for selecting the university's replacement for former president Lawrence Summers, had been given a list of "potential candidates" that included her name.

In August 2007, Simmons was invited to deliver the 60th Annual Reading of the historic 1790 George Washington Letter to Touro Synagogue at the Synagogue in Newport, Rhode Island, in response to Moses Seixas on the subject of religious pluralism. According to a March 2009 poll by The Brown Daily Herald, Simmons had more than an 80% approval rating among Brown undergraduates.

In September 2011, Simmons announced that she would step down from her position as Brown President at the end of the 2011–12 academic year, initially saying she would remain at Brown as a professor of comparative literature and Africana studies. She was succeeded as the Brown President on June 30, 2012, by Christina Paxson.

Goldman Sachs role and compensation 
Simmons earned annual compensation of over $300,000 from Goldman Sachs (on top of her annual salary from Brown of over $500,000) while serving on the Goldman board of directors during the late-2000s financial crisis; in addition, she left the Goldman board (which she had joined in 2000) in 2009 with over $4.3 million in Goldman stock. During her term on Goldman's board, she also served on the compensation committee of Goldman's ten-person board, which decided how large Goldman executives' post-crash bonuses would be: these bonuses included a $68 million bonus for the company's chairman and CEO, Lloyd C. Blankfein, in 2007, and a $9 million bonus in 2009, after Goldman received money in the federal TARP bailout. The revelations of Simmons's role received intense criticism from both alumni and students with a then-sophomore stating that Simmons's actions "brought shame on the university." Simmons was cited in the 2010 film Inside Job, as an example of the conflicts of interest between university economics departments and deregulation of financial institutions.

Transnational initiatives at Brown 

As the wealth that the founding Brown family contributed to the university was based in part on the triangular slave trade, in 2003, Simmons established the University Steering Committee on Slavery and Justice. The Report of the Brown University Steering Committee on Slavery and Justice was subsequently published. On February 16, 2007, at an event celebrating the 200th anniversary of the passage of the Slave Trade Act of 1807 and the involvement of Cambridge University alumni William Wilberforce, Thomas Clarkson and William Pitt the Younger, Simmons delivered a lecture at St. John's College, Cambridge, entitled Hidden in Plain Sight: Slavery and Justice in Rhode Island. Also in February 2007, Brown University published its official Response to the Report of the Steering Committee on Slavery and Justice following the completion of the historic inquiry undertaken by the committee appointed by Simmons.

In October 2007, Simmons appointed David W. Kennedy, the former Manley O. Hudson Professor of Law at Harvard Law School, as vice president for international affairs. In addition to supporting the leadership of the Watson Institute for International Studies, the new university officer will lead a multidisciplinary advanced research project in the field of global law, governance and social thought to strengthen the University's international work in the social sciences.

As an additional element of Simmons' leadership of Brown's international efforts, Brown and Banco Santander of Spain inaugurated an annual series of International Advanced Research Institutes to convene younger scholars from emerging and developing countries at Brown in a signing ceremony on November 13, 2008, at the John Hay Library between Brown provost David Kertzer and Emilio Botin, chairman of Banco Santander. As noted by Simmons: "To be at the forefront of research today means being in conversation with global peers.

In March 2010, Simmons travelled to India as part of a major program, called the Year of India: dedicated to improving the understanding of Indian history, politics, education and culture among Brown students and faculty.

On September 15, 2011, Simmons announced that she would step down from the Brown presidency at the end of the academic year, June 30, 2012.

Prairie View A&M University presidency 
After five years of retirement from Brown University, Simmons was invited to take on the presidency of Prairie View A&M University, an HBCU in Texas.  Following several meetings with TAMUS Chancellor John Sharp and the Board of Regents, on June 19, 2017, she agreed to step in as the interim president of Prairie View, assuming the office on July 1, 2017. On December 4, 2017, she was officially named the eighth president of Prairie View A&M University. She is the first woman selected to serve as president of Prairie View A&M.

At Prairie View A&M, Simmons focused her efforts on improving the financial stability of the university, particularly on fundraising tens of millions dollars for the Panther Success Grants.  Her vision for the university: “I plan to ensure that Prairie View A&M University sustains excellence in teaching, research and service for another 140-plus years.  We will promote throughout the country a narrative of a Prairie View that is strong, and we will raise funds in a new and vital way so that the University will have the flexibility it needs to advance and make more visible its reach.”  On March 11, 2022, Simmons announced that she will step down as president when the university names her successor.  In 2022, the university announced that during Simmons presidency scholarships had increased and donations to the university had grown by 40%.

Civic activities and honors 
 Simmons is a fellow of the American Academy of Arts and Sciences, the American Philosophical Society, and the Council on Foreign Relations. She has served as chair of the Council of Ivy Group Presidents and is an honorary fellow of Selwyn College, Cambridge.
 Simmons serves on the boards of Texas Instruments and Fiat Chrysler Automobiles. She announced in 2007 that she would not seek re-election to the board of directors of Pfizer after serving on the board for 10 years.

 In 2000, Simmons received the Golden Plate Award of the American Academy of Achievement.
 On June 17, 2009, The White House announced that President Barack Obama had appointed Dr. Simmons to the President's Commission on White House Fellowships.
 On January 16, 2010, Simmons received a BET Honors award for her service as president of Brown University.
 In 2010, she was awarded the Ellis Island Medal of Honor for her many humanitarian efforts.
 Simmons was selected for the inaugural 2021 Forbes 50 Over 50; made up of entrepreneurs, leaders, scientists and creators who are over the age of 50.

Honoris causa degrees

An honorary degree is an academic degree for which a university (or other degree-awarding institution) has waived all of the usual requirements. It is also known by the Latin phrases honoris causa ("for the sake of the honor") or ad honored ("to the honor").

See also

References

External links
 Ruth J. Simmons: 2001–2012; from the Office of the President, Brown University
 "Ruth Simmons". Video produced by Makers: Women Who Make America

|-

|-

1945 births
African-American academics
African-American educators
American academic administrators
American educational theorists
American people of Gabonese descent
American people of Kota (Gabon) descent
American people of Caribbean descent
American women academics
Brown University faculty
Dillard University alumni
Harvard University alumni
Literature educators
Living people
Native American academics
Native American women academics
People from Grapeland, Texas
Presidents of Brown University
Presidents of Smith College
Prairie View A&M University people
Princeton University faculty
Women heads of universities and colleges
21st-century African-American people
21st-century African-American women
20th-century African-American people
20th-century African-American women
Members of the American Philosophical Society
Fulbright alumni